Synnöve Solbakken is a Swedish silent film from 1919 directed by John W. Brunius. The screenplay was written by Brunius and Sam Ask. It is based on Bjørnstjerne Bjørnson's 1857 novel Synnøve Solbakken. The novel was adapted for film two additional times in Sweden (in 1934 and 1957).

Filming
The film was shot in the summer of 1919 at the Skandiaateljén studio in the Långängen neighborhood of Stocksund, Sweden and in Sel in Norway's Gudbrand Valley.

Plot
Thorbjörn and Synnöve fall in love with each other as children. He is rumored to be a fighter, and her parents consider him unfit for her. They do not meet for several years, and in the meantime Synnöve rejects many suitors. After Thorbjörn is stabbed with a knife, Synnöve's parents realize that he is not so violent after all, and they accept his proposal.

Cast

References

External links

Swedish romantic drama films
Swedish silent feature films
1919 films
1919 romantic drama films
Swedish black-and-white films
Silent romantic drama films